Brooklyn Township is a township in Lincoln County, South Dakota, United States, in the Sioux Falls metropolitan area. Its population was 233 at the 2000 census.

Located in the southwestern corner of Lincoln County, Brooklyn Township borders the following other townships:
Delaware Township — north
Lincoln Township — northeastern corner
Pleasant Township — east
Prairie Township, Union County — southeastern corner
Glenwood Township, Clay County — south
Riverside Township, Clay County — southwestern corner
Centerville Township, Turner County — west
Turner Township, Turner County — northwestern corner

References

Townships in Lincoln County, South Dakota
Townships in South Dakota